Ciba is a genus of Caribbean wandering spiders first described in 2014.  it contains only two species. It is one of two species of eyeless spiders found in a Hispaniola cave. The non-expression of eyes and eye pigment in the Ciba as an energy-saving adaption in response to their dark cave habitat.

References

Araneomorphae genera
Ctenidae